Eleutheranthera is a genus of flowering plants in the family Asteraceae.

 Species
 Eleutheranthera ruderalis (Sw.) Sch.Bip. - native to Central America, the West Indies, and northern South America; naturalized in Asia, Australia, southern South America, and various oceanic islands
 Eleutheranthera tenella (Kunth) H.Rob. - Colombia

References

Heliantheae
Asteraceae genera